Pineus is a genus of aphids in the family Adelgidae. There are more than 20 described species in Pineus.

Species
These 29 species belong to the genus Pineus:

 Pineus abietinus Underwood & Balch, 1964
 Pineus armandicola Zhang, Zhong & Zhang, 1992
 Pineus boerneri Annand, 1928
 Pineus boycei Annand, 1928
 Pineus cembrae (Cholodkovsky, 1888)
 Pineus cladogenous Fang & Sun, 1985
 Pineus coloradensis (Gillette, 1907)
 Pineus cortecicolus Fang & Sun, 1985
 Pineus engelmannii Annand, 1928
 Pineus floccus (Patch, 1909)
 Pineus ghanii Yaseen & Ghani, 1971
 Pineus harukawai Inouye, 1945
 Pineus havrylenkoi Blanchard, 1944
 Pineus hosoyai Inouye, 1945
 Pineus konowashiyai Inouye, 1945
 Pineus laevis (Maskell, 1885)
 Pineus matsumurai Inouye, 1945
 Pineus orientalis (Dreyfus, 1888)
 Pineus patchae Börner, 1926
 Pineus pineoides (Cholodkovsky, 1903)
 Pineus pini (Goeze, 1778)
 Pineus pinifoliae (Fitch, 1858)
 Pineus piniyunnanensis Zhang, Zhong & Zhang, 1992
 Pineus sichunanus Zhang, 1980
 Pineus similis (Gillette, 1907) (ragged spruce gall adelgid)
 Pineus simmondsi Yaseen & Ghani, 1971
 Pineus strobi (Hartig, 1839) (pine bark adelgid)
 Pineus sylvestris Annand, 1928
 Pineus wallichianae Yaseen & Ghani, 1971

References

External links

 

Sternorrhyncha